Robert Pfarr (July 24, 1920 – October 15, 2006) was an American cyclist. He competed in the team pursuit at the 1960 Summer Olympics. Pfarr also won the Wisconsin bicycle racing championship 12 times and in 1951 he was selected to represent the United States at the Pan American Games in Buenos Aires.

References

External links
 
 

1920 births
2006 deaths
American male cyclists
American track cyclists
Olympic cyclists of the United States
Cyclists at the 1960 Summer Olympics
Sportspeople from Kenosha, Wisconsin
Cyclists from Wisconsin
Pan American Games medalists in cycling
Pan American Games gold medalists for the United States
People from Somers, Wisconsin
Competitors at the 1959 Pan American Games
Medalists at the 1959 Pan American Games